Efzar District is a district (bakhsh) in Qir and Karzin County, Fars Province, Iran. At the 2006 census, its population was 14,040, in 2,966 families.  The District has one city: Efzar.  The District has two rural districts (dehestan): Efzar Rural District and Zakharuiyeh Rural District.

References 

Qir and Karzin County
Districts of Fars Province